Tom Braly Municipal Stadium is a 14,215-seat stadium in Florence, Alabama.  It is primarily used for American football, and is the home field of the University of North Alabama Lions and the Florence High School Falcons. It also hosted the NCAA Division II Football Championship games from 1986 to 2013, which were broadcast on ESPN. UNA holds a 252-114-8 record at Braly Stadium. It has also hosted 30 of UNA's 47 Division II Playoff games.

Name
The stadium is a block east of the university campus and adjacent to the Florence Middle School. The middle school was formerly Coffee High School, but was transformed in 2004 when Florence's two public high schools merged.  Braly is named for Thomas Braly, Jr., a Coffee High School coach who was principal of the school from 1945 until his death in 1963.

Facilities
Seating capacity has increased by 6,200 seats since 1980 (5,000 in 1980 and 1,200 in 1998). The original playing surface featured a sand foundation that enabled the field to withstand six inches (152 mm) of rain at one time without altering the footing; however, that surface was replaced with ProGrass synthetic turf during the summer of 2010.

Other renovations include a $175,000 scoreboard with a message center installed in 1995 and a 1998 renovation that doubled the working press area as well as provided additional restrooms and viewing booths for game administration. The 1995 scoreboard was replaced in 2010 with a $57,000 LED based scoreboard along with a new elevator to the press box and a resealing of the running track around the field.

The new three-level press box consists of a first level that seats up to 50 sportswriters.  The second level has areas for coaching staffs from competing schools, the public address announcer, the clock operator, the stadium manager, and also provides space for radio crews from both home and visiting teams.  The third floor is used by television and film crews.

References

College football venues
North Alabama Lions football
American football venues in Alabama
North Alabama Lions sports venues
Buildings and structures in Florence, Alabama
High school football venues in the United States
1949 establishments in Alabama
Sports venues completed in 1949